Nankinian's is one of the Finisterre languages of Papua New Guinea. Nankina Wam,Domung Meh,Yupno Gen. is a related variety.

Domung meh is spoken in Yout village of Nayudo Rural LLG, while Domung is spoken in Aunon, Ayengket, Bobongat, Dirit, Gabutamon, Kian, Kosit, Maramung, Maum, Sibgou, Swantan, Tapen, and Wokopop villages in Madang Province. Also Nankina is spoken in Taip, Yowangowo,Bambu,Meweng, Ayongowo,Gupbayong,Mambak,Sepbawang, Sevan,kandambo,Gwarawon, MIOK,pivin,mebu,Tariknan,Youthbo,Mambit, Dakuwe,and Yongem .in Raicoast District Madang province.

References

Finisterre languages
Languages of Madang Province